Hermine "Miep" Gies (15 February 1909 – 11 January 2010) was one of the Dutch citizens who hid Anne Frank, her family (Otto Frank, Margot Frank, Edith Frank) and four other Dutch Jews (Fritz Pfeffer, Hermann van Pels, Auguste van Pels, Peter van Pels) from the Nazis in an annex above Otto Frank's business premises during World War II. She was Austrian by birth, but in 1920, at the age of eleven, she was taken in as a foster child by a Dutch family in Leiden to whom she became very attached. Although she was initially only to stay for six months, this stay was extended to one year because of frail health, after which Gies chose to remain with them, living the rest of her life in the Netherlands. She died in 2010 at age 100, a month before her 101st birthday.

In 1933, Gies began working for Otto Frank, a Jewish businessman who had moved with his family from Germany to the Netherlands in the hope of sparing his family from Nazi persecution. She became a close, trusted friend of the Frank family and was a great support to them during the twenty-five months they spent in hiding. Together with her colleague Bep Voskuijl, she retrieved Anne Frank's diary after the family was arrested, and kept the papers safe until Otto Frank returned from Auschwitz in June 1945 and learned of his younger daughter's death soon afterwards. Gies had stored Anne Frank's papers in the hopes of returning them to the girl, but gave them to Otto Frank, who compiled them into a diary first published in June 1947.
In collaboration with Alison Leslie Gold, Gies wrote the book Anne Frank Remembered: The Story of the Woman Who Helped to Hide the Frank Family in 1987.

Early life 
Born in Vienna, Austria, to Karoline Maria Santrouschitz, Gies was transported to Leiden from Vienna in December 1920 to escape the food shortages prevailing in Austria after World War I. The Nieuwenburgs, a working-class family who already had five children of their own, took her as their foster daughter, and called her by the diminutive "Miep" by which she became known. In 1922, she moved with her foster family to Gaaspstraat 25 in Amsterdam. Gies was an honor student, and described herself as "reserved and very independent"; after graduating high school, she worked as an accountant and then in 1933 as a secretary with the Dutch branch of the German spice firm Opekta (later known as Gies & Company). Gies wrote, "But the office was not the only thing in my life. My social life at this time was very lively. I loved to dance and belonged like many young Dutch girls, to a dance club."

Otto Frank had just relocated from Germany and had been appointed managing director of Opekta's recently expanded Dutch operations. Gies, Frank's employee, became a close friend of the family, as did her fiancé, Jan Gies. After refusing to join a Nazi women's association, her passport was invalidated, and she was ordered to be deported back to Austria within 90 days (by then annexed by Germany, which classified her as a German citizen). The couple faced some difficulties, but they were married on 16 July 1941 so that she could obtain Dutch citizenship and thus evade deportation. "Anne was impressed with my gold ring. She looked at it dreamily. (...) Because times were hard, we had only one ring, although the custom was for a couple to have two. Henk [In her book, Miep called Jan by the name of Henk, because Anne Frank had used that pseudonym in her diary] and I had barely scraped together enough money for one gold ring. He had insisted that I should wear it." Gies's fluency in Dutch and German helped the Frank family assimilate into Dutch society, and she and her husband became regular guests at the Franks' home.

Hiding the families
With her husband Jan and other Opekta employees (Victor Kugler, Johannes Kleiman and Bep Voskuijl), Miep Gies helped hide Otto and Edith Frank; their daughters Margot and Anne; Hermann, Auguste and Peter van Pels; and Fritz Pfeffer in several upstairs rooms in the company's office building on Amsterdam's Prinsengracht from 6 July 1942 to 4 August 1944. In an interview, Gies said she was glad to help the families hide because she was extremely concerned after seeing what was happening to the Jews in Amsterdam. Every day, she saw trucks loaded with Jews heading to the railway station, en route to Nazi concentration camps. She did not tell anyone, not even her own foster parents, about the people in hiding whom she was assisting.

When purchasing food for the people in hiding, Gies avoided suspicion in many ways: for example, by visiting several different suppliers in a day. She never carried more than what one shopping bag could hold or what she could hide under her coat. To prevent the Opekta workers from becoming suspicious, Gies tried not to enter the hiding place during office hours. Her husband also helped by providing ration cards that he had obtained illegally. By visiting various grocery shops and markets on a regular basis, Gies developed a good sense of the supply situation.

At their apartment, close to the Merwedeplein where the Franks had lived before going into hiding, Gies and her husband Jan (who belonged to the Dutch resistance) also hid an anti-Nazi university student.

The capture
On the morning of 4 August 1944, sitting at her desk, Gies, along with Voskuijl and Kleiman, was confronted by a man with a gun commanding "Stay put! Don't move! Not a sound!" The families had been betrayed and the Grüne Polizei arrested the people hidden at 263 Prinsengracht, as well as Kugler and Kleiman. The next day, Gies went to the German police office to try to find the arrestees. She offered money to buy their freedom but did not succeed. Gies and the other helpers could have been executed if they had been caught hiding Jews; however, she was not arrested because the police officer who came to interrogate her was from Vienna, her birth town. She recognized his accent and told him they had the same hometown. He was amazed, then started pacing and cursing at her, finally deciding to let her stay. Gies remained safe with her husband in Amsterdam throughout the rest of the war.

Before the hiding place was emptied by the authorities, Gies and the younger secretary Bep Voskuijl retrieved parts of Anne Frank's diaries and saved them in their desk drawer. Gies was determined to give them back to Anne. After the war had ended and it was confirmed that Anne Frank had perished in the Bergen-Belsen concentration camp, Gies gave the collection of papers and notebooks to the sole survivor from the Secret Annex, Otto Frank. After transcribing sections for his family, his daughter's literary ability became apparent and he arranged for the book's publication in 1947. Gies did not read the diaries before turning them over to Otto and later remarked that if she had, she would have had to destroy them because the papers contained the names of all five of the helpers as well as of their black-market suppliers. She was persuaded by Otto Frank to read the diary in its second printing.

Miep Gies had assured Anne Frank's biographer Melissa Müller repeatedly that she did not think the main suspect, Willem van Maaren, was the culprit in the betrayal.

Gies was interviewed about her memories of hiding the Frank family for the 1995 documentary film Anne Frank Remembered by Jon Blair.

Honors and awards

In 1994, Gies was awarded the Order of Merit of the Federal Republic of Germany as well as the Wallenberg Medal by the University of Michigan. The following year, Gies received the Yad Vashem Righteous Among the Nations medal. In 1997, she was knighted in the Order of Orange-Nassau by Queen Beatrix of the Netherlands. The minor planet 99949 Miepgies is named in her honor. She always maintained that while she appreciated the honors, they embarrassed her: "I am not a hero. I am not a special person. I don't want attention. I did what any decent person would have done."

On 30 July 2009, the Austrian Ambassador to the Netherlands, Wolfgang Paul, presented Grand Decoration of Honour for Services to the Republic of Austria to Gies at her home.

Death
On 11 January 2010, a month before her 101st birthday, Miep Gies died in the city of Hoorn after suffering injuries from a fall.

Further reading
 : Frauen mit Visionen – 48 Europäerinnen (Women with visions – 48 Europeans). With text by Alice Schwarzer. Munich: Knesebeck, 2004. , 88–95 p.

Notes

References

External links

  Official website of Miep Gies (English)
  
 Profile of Miep Gies from the Anne Frank Museum
 Miep Gies – her activity to save Jews' lives during the Holocaust, at Yad Vashem website
 Holocaust Rescuers Bibliography with information and links to books about Miep Gies and other Dutch rescuers
 Miep Gies - Daily Telegraph obituary
 Miep Gies Find a Grave

1909 births
2010 deaths
Accidental deaths from falls
Austrian emigrants to the Netherlands
Dutch centenarians
Dutch humanitarians
Women humanitarians
Dutch Roman Catholics
Austrian Roman Catholics
Dutch people of World War II
Dutch resistance members
Dutch Righteous Among the Nations
Officers Crosses of the Order of Merit of the Federal Republic of Germany
Recipients of the Grand Decoration for Services to the Republic of Austria
Knights of the Order of Orange-Nassau
Women in World War II
Austrian centenarians
Women centenarians
People from Vienna
Anne Frank